Lagar Velho is a rock-shelter in the Lapedo valley, a limestone canyon 13 km from the centre of Leiria, in the municipality of Leiria, in central Portugal. The site is known for the discovery of a 24,000-year-old Cro-Magnon child, later referred to as the Lapedo child.

History

In archaeological terms, the site is known to integrate a stratigraphic sequence representative of much of the Upper Paleolithic human occupations of the region (between about 30,000 and 20,000 years), gathering at various levels respective traces and carved lithic remnants, associated with coeval faunal elements. The site consists of deposits within horizontal fissures, at the base of a limestone cliff, located on the south flank of the Lapedo Valley near Leiria, in the central western region of Portugal. The site was initially damaged by earth removal in 1992, that exposed an Upper Paleolithic sequence, that came within centimeters of the burial. On 28 November 1998, the site was discovered by archaeologists, who also found the left hand and forearm of a child found in a burrow. In the following weeks others confirmed the presence of Paleolithic deposits and the human burial, and excavation ensued between 12 December 1998 and 7 January (with pathological analysis beginning on 4 January 1999). 

The discovery of an early Upper Paleolithic human burial site in the valley provided evidence of early modern humans in southern Iberia. The remains, the largely complete skeleton of an approximately 4-year-old child, was buried with a pierced shell and red ochre (dated to circa 24,500 years B.P.). The cranium, mandible, dentition, and postcrania appear to present a mosaic of European early modern human and Neanderthal features, although this interpretation is disputed. If the child was indeed a hybrid of anatomically modern humans and Homo neanderthalensis, there could be significant implications regarding the Neanderthal interaction with Cro-Magnons and the taxonomical classification of these (possibly sub-) species.

In addition to the burial context, recent archaeological campaigns have uncovered various levels of a Gravettian habitat, identifying an excellent state of preservation and original spatial organization.

It is anticipated that archaeological museum, to be constructed in the Convent of Santo Agostinho, in the city of Leiria, will house the skeletal remains.

Geography
Situated between the civil parishes of Caranguejeira and Santa Eufémia, the Valley of Lapedo is formed by the waters of the Ribeira de Caranguejeira. It is an area of natural diversity of flora and fauna, that includes Carrion Crows (Corvus corone), eagles and field rats, in addition to Black, European or Common Alder (Alnus glutinosa), Willow (genus Salix), European or Common Ash (Fraxinus excelsior), Populus  (family Salicaceae) and Vitis grapevines (of the family Vitaceae).

References

External links

Article in PNAS (1999)
Article in Athena Review

Prehistoric sites in Portugal
National monuments in Leiria District
Neanderthal sites